Cameron Bridge is a village in the conurbation of Levenmouth in Fife, Scotland. A distillery was established in the 19th century by the Haig family, which is now part of Diageo. The distillery produces Scotch whisky.

History and locality 
It is a settlement at a bridge over the River Leven, which replaced a ford there. When Leven was flooded it was the first upstream crossing. In 1870, an earlier bridge was replaced with a new one. The River Ore joins the Leven a little upstream of the village.

Future transport
A railway station could be located in Cameron Bridge in the future, which would also serve as at Park and Ride site. Rail freight provisions could also be provided to serve the distillery. This is as part of the Levenmouth rail link.

The Cameronbridge Grain Distillery

Cameronbridge Grain Distillery is currently the largest of the remaining grain distilleries in Scotland and is owned by Diageo.

References

External links

Village website

Levenmouth
Villages in Fife